Věra Bradáčová (born 12 October 1955) is a Czech athlete. She competed in the women's high jump at the 1976 Summer Olympics.

References

External links
 

1955 births
Living people
Athletes (track and field) at the 1976 Summer Olympics
Czech female high jumpers
Olympic athletes of Czechoslovakia
People from Nový Bor
Sportspeople from the Liberec Region